Brigittea civica (syn.: Dictyna civica) is spider species found in Europe, North Africa, Turkey and North America.

See also 
 List of Dictynidae species

References 

Dictynidae
Spiders of Africa
Spiders of North America
Arthropods of Turkey
Spiders described in 1850
Spiders of Europe